Lakshmipat Singhania Academy (LSA) are a group of schools run by Lakshmipat Singhania Education Foundation, a subsidiary of the J.K. Group. There are two branches of LSA - in Kolkata, West Bengal and Bissau, Jhunjhunu  District, Rajasthan. The schools are affiliated to the Central Board of Secondary Education. They are coeducational schools with classes ranging from Pre-Primary to Secondary level.

History
The Lakshmipat Singhania Education Foundation was founded in the 1960s to promote education in India. The Kolkata branch of the school opened in 1996. It is located at the intersection of Alipore Road and Judge's Court Road.

Student life
The Kolkata Branch has four houses- Vayu (yellow), Agni (red), Jal (blue) and Prithvi (green). The students are divided into four houses, and a number of events are organised in which the houses compete against each other.  The Student Council and Committee elections are held each year in which students choose their representatives for the whole year.

A student from the Kolkata branch topped West Bengal in the 2007 CBSE Class 12 examination.

The school fest Abhilasha is celebrated once every four years in which students from all over Kolkata take part. The last Abhilakshya was held in 2013. Kolkata's first inter-school IT fest, was also organised by LSA.

Lakshmipat Singhania Academy Bissau also has four houses- Jai (green), Kumbha (red), Pratap (yellow), and Sanga (blue). These represent great kings of ancient Rajasthan. The students are divided into these four houses, and intra-school activities are organised around the year, in which these houses compete against each other. Elections are held every year, in which the students vote, and choose their prefects. 

An annual function (Founder's Day) is held every year, for which a grand exhibition is held in the school, and cultural programs are organised for the guests.

Major awards
Telegraph School of the year award - 2005 
Telegraph School of the year award - 2007
International School Award (given by the British Council) - 2007 to 2010
Intel Awards for best integration of technology in education - 2007
International Space Settlement Design Competition 2013.
International Space Settlement Design Competition 2014.
International space settlement competition 2019

Notable alumni
 Saket Modi - CEO, Lucideus and Indian Ambassador of Cyber Security in Education
 Saurav Ghosal - squash, current World Rank 17
 Sohini Paul - actress
 Jaimin Rajani - Composer, Singer-Songwriter

Results
The 2012 of AISSCE 2012  resulted in 54 students getting above 90% aggregate.

References

External links
 LSA Kolkata Website
 LSA Bissau Website

Schools in Rajasthan
Schools in Kolkata
Educational institutions established in 1996
Educational organisations based in India
1996 establishments in West Bengal